The Eurovision Song Contest 1970 was the 15th edition of the annual Eurovision Song Contest and took place in Amsterdam, Netherlands. Organised by the European Broadcasting Union (EBU) and host broadcaster Nederlandse Omroep Stichting (NOS), the contest was held at the RAI Congrescentrum on 21 March 1970, and was hosted by Dutch television presenter Willy Dobbe.

A draw of ballots between these two countries resulted in the Netherlands being chosen as the host country.

Twelve countries participated in the contest this year. This was the lowest number of participants since the  edition.

This was Ireland's first of their eventual record seven victories in the contest. The  finished in second place for the seventh time, while  ended up in third placethe best result for the country at the time. This was also the only time that  received nul points.

Location 

The Congrescentrum, venue of the 1970 contest, is a semi-permanent exhibit at the Ferdinand Bolstraat to Amsterdam and was opened on 31 October 1922. This building was replaced in 1961 by the current RAI building on Europe's Square.  The current congress and event center on Europe Square, was designed by Alexander Bodon and opened on 2 February 1961.

Format 
The Dutch producers were forced to pad out the show as only 12 nations decided to make the trip to Amsterdam. The result was a format that has endured almost to the present day. An extended opening sequence (filmed in Amsterdam) set the scene, while every entry was introduced by a short video 'postcard' featuring each of the participating artists, ostensibly in their own nation. However, the 'postcards' for Switzerland, Luxembourg and Monaco were all filmed on location in Paris (as was the French postcard). The long introduction film (over four minutes long) was followed by what probably is one of the shortest ever introductions by any presenter. Willy Dobbe only welcomed the viewers in English, French and Dutch, finishing her introduction after only 24 seconds. On-screen captions introduced each entry, with the song titles listed all in lowercase and the names of the artist and composers/authors all in capitals.

The set design was devised by Roland de Groot; a simple design was composed of a number of curved horizontal bars and silver baubles which could be moved in a variety of different ways.

To avoid an incident like in 1969, a tie-breaking rule was created. It stated that, if two or more songs gained the same number of votes and were tied for first place, each song would have to be performed again. After which each national jury (other than the juries of the countries concerned) would have a show of hands of which they thought was the best. If the countries tied again, then they would share first place.

Participating countries 

Austria (who had not taken part in 1969), Finland, Norway, Portugal and Sweden boycotted this contest as they were not pleased with the result of 1969 and the voting structure. Portugal did however host a national final, being won by Sérgio Borges.

Of the participating singers, a number were already established performers. Notably, the United Kingdom sent Welsh singer and Apple recording artist Mary Hopkin, while David Alexandre Winter represented Luxembourg. The contest is also notable for the appearance of the then unknown Julio Iglesias, singing for Spain.

Voting and aftermath 

In the run-up to the contest, the United Kingdom were favourites to win and also the favourite with the 50-piece orchestra. So sure of victory, the UK delegation had organised a winner's party to be thrown after the contest. In the end, the only two countries in the running were the UK and Ireland, albeit the latter holding the lead throughout the voting. Ireland took the victory with 32 points, 6 points ahead of the UK, with Germany a distant third. Luxembourg failed to score any points at all – their only time ever to do so.

Ireland won the contest with "All Kinds of Everything", penned by Derry Lindsay and Jackie Smith, and sung by another unknown, Dana, an 18-year-old schoolgirl from Derry, Northern Ireland. Scottish songwriter Bill Martin, who was responsible for the winning song's publishing, has on numerous subsequent occasions claimed that he and his song writing partner Phil Coulter (the team behind both Puppet on a String and Congratulations) actually wrote the song themselves, but were prevented from using their names on the credit. Coulter has never repeated the claim and there is nothing public to substantiate Martin's story and it was only made after both Lindsay and Smith had died. The song became a million-seller and the singer an international star. As the contest was held in the Netherlands this year, and the country was one of the four winners in 1969, Dana received her awards from the Dutch winner Lenny Kuhr.

Mary Hopkin scored a few more hits but downscaled her music career in 1971 after getting married. She later commented on her appearance at the contest as humiliating and said that she hated the song she had to sing. Spanish entrant Julio Iglesias went on to achieve worldwide success in the decades that followed, becoming one of the top-selling singers of all time. Dana, meanwhile, continued to score hit singles throughout the 1970s with songs such as "Fairytale" and "It's Gonna be a Cold Cold Christmas". In the 1990s she became a politician, running for the Irish presidential election in 1997 and 2011, and becoming an MEP in 1999.

Of the other performers, Stella Maessen (of Hearts of Soul), Jean Vallée, Guy Bonnet and Katja Ebstein all later took part in the contest again, the latter twice more. The following year, Austria, Finland, Norway, Portugal and Sweden all returned to the contest.

Conductors 
Each performance had a conductor who led the orchestral accompaniment.

 Dolf van der Linden
 Bernard Gérard
 
 Mojmir Sepe
 Jack Say
 Franck Pourcel
 Johnny Arthey
 Raymond Lefèvre
 Augusto Algueró
 
 
 Dolf van der Linden

Participants and results 

For the first time, no artists from previous contests returned.

Detailed voting results

Spokespersons 

Listed below is the order in which votes were cast during the 1970 contest along with the spokesperson who was responsible for announcing the votes for their respective country.

 Flip van der Schalie
 
 Enzo Tortora
 Dragana Marković
 André Hagon
 
 Colin Ward-Lewis
 TBC
 Ramón Rivera
 TBC
 
 John Skehan

Broadcasts 

Each participating broadcaster was required to relay the contest via its networks. Non-participating EBU member broadcasters were also able to relay the contest as "passive participants". Broadcasters were able to send commentators to provide coverage of the contest in their own native language and to relay information about the artists and songs to their television viewers.

Known details on the broadcasts in each country, including the specific broadcasting stations and commentators are shown in the tables below. In addition to the participating countries, the contest was also reportedly broadcast in Greece, Iceland, Israel and Tunisia, in Bulgaria, Czechoslovakia, Hungary, Poland, Romania and the Soviet Union via Intervision, and in Brazil and Chile.

Notes

References

External links

 
1970
Music festivals in the Netherlands
1970 in music
1970 in the Netherlands
1970s in Amsterdam
March 1970 events in Europe
Events in Amsterdam
Music in Amsterdam